The Farmers and Mechanics National Bank is located at 714 Main Street in Fort Worth, Texas, at the corner of Main and Seventh streets. The building is the future home to the Kimpton Harper Hotel, which is scheduled to open in spring 2021.

Designed in the Chicago Style the building was constructed in 1921.  It was designed by the prominent architectural firm Sanguinet and Staats.  The building was constructed during a time when Fort Worth was experiencing tremendous growth as a result of the oil and cattle industry.  It remained the tallest building in Fort Worth until 1957.  The building was vacant from 1997 until 2007 when XTO purchased the building and started renovations.

It has also been known as Fort Worth National Bank; Continental Life; Transport Life; A. Davis Men's, and 714 Main.

It is a three-part vertical block building.

See also

National Register of Historic Places listings in Tarrant County, Texas

References

External links

Architecture in Fort Worth: 714 Main

Buildings and structures completed in 1921
National Register of Historic Places in Tarrant County, Texas
Early Commercial architecture in the United States